The 2015 Copa América de Futsal was the 11th edition of the Copa América de Futsal, the international futsal championship under FIFA rules organised by CONMEBOL for the men's national teams of South America. The tournament was held in Portoviejo, Ecuador between August 23–30, 2015.

Teams
A total of nine CONMEBOL member national teams participated in the tournament. Bolivia did not participate due to financial problems.

Venues
All matches were played in one venue: Complejo Deportivo La California in Portoviejo.

Referees
The official referees for the tournament were announced on 10 August 2015.

 Darío Santamarina
 Leonardo Lorenzo
 Henry Gutiérrez
 Gean Telles
 Cristian Espíndola
 Hugo Camargo
 Gury García
 Jaime Játiva
 José Hernández
 Elvis Peña
 Jorge Galeano
 Mario Espichan
 César Málaga
 Daniel Rodríguez
 Federico Cardozo
 Félix Rumbos

Group stage
The nine teams were drawn into one group of five teams and one group of four teams. The hosts Ecuador were placed in Group A, plus each group contained one team from each of the four "pairing pots": Argentina–Brazil, Colombia–Paraguay, Peru–Uruguay, Chile–Venezuela.

The top two teams of each group advance to the semi-finals, while the teams in third and fourth advance to the fifth place and seventh place play-offs respectively. The teams are ranked according to points (3 points for a win, 1 point for a draw, 0 points for a loss). If tied on points, tiebreakers are applied in the following order:
Goal difference in all games;
Goals scored in all games;
Head-to-head result in games between tied teams (two teams only);
Drawing of lots.

All times are local, ECT (UTC−5).

Group A

Group B

Knockout stage
In the knockout stage, extra time and penalty shoot-out are used to decide the winner if necessary.

Bracket

Seventh place play-off

Fifth place play-off

Semi-finals

Third place play-off

Final

Final ranking

Per statistical convention in futsal, matches decided in extra time are counted as wins and losses, while matches decided by penalty shoot-out are counted as draws.

Goalscorers
10 goals
 Juan Salas

5 goals
 Alamiro Vaporaki

4 goals

 Santiago Basile
 Matías Kruger

3 goals

 Lucas Bolo
 Dieguinho
 Rodrigo
 Angellot Caro
 René Villalba
 Nicolás Zaffe

2 goals

 Gonzalo Abdala
 Gadeia
 Jackson
 Pito
 Simi
 Carlos Arriola
 Juan Antonio Carrasco
 Milenko Pávez
 Luis Alcívar
 Jimmy Espinales
 Richard Rejala
 Martín Herrera
 Renzo Ramírez
 Xavier Tavera
 Santiago Blankleider
 Rosward Manzanares
 Carlos Polo

1 goal

 Lucho González
 Damián Stazzone
 Arthur
 Ciço
 Thiaguinho
 Xuxa
 Bernardo Araya
 Frank Carrasco
 Nilson Concha
 Diego Fuentes
 Yerko García
 Christopher Reyes
 Luis Barreneche
 Yulián Díaz
 Andrés Camilo Reyes
 Johan Vivares
 Darío Meza
 Fabio Alcaraz
 Emanuel Ayala
 Gabriel Giménez
 Francisco Martínez
 Hugo Martínez
 Magno Pereira
 Jorge Aguilar
 Vladimir Falla
 Jorge Yuptun
 Nicolás Ordaqui
 Alexis Otero
 Ignacio Salgues
 José Falcón
 Wilfredo Figueroa
 Johan Quinteros
 Kevin Rengifo
 Edgar Rodríguez
 Paolo Sánchez

References

External links

Copa América Futsal, CONMEBOL.com

2015
2015 Copa America Futsal
2015 in futsal
2015 in Ecuadorian football
Futsal